Myrtle Beach Seadawgs were an American soccer team that played in Myrtle Beach, South Carolina.  Their home field was Doug Shaw Memorial Stadium.

The roster included Eric Schmitt, Jimmy May, Willie Files, Ross Moore, Barry Hope, Miguel Calderón, Jeremy Eason, Neil Payne, Gerard Jones, Scott Schweitzer, Warren Russ, Dave Mallick, Michael Parry, Bradley Bennett, Greg Richards, Ryan Walker, Jeff Johnson, Pablo González, Joe Bowman.

In April 1997, the professional female golfer Laura Davies played six minutes for the club in a league game.

Head coaches
  John Farrelly
  David Irving
 Marcelo Neveleff 1999

Year-by-year

References

Defunct soccer clubs in South Carolina
USL Second Division teams
1997 establishments in South Carolina
1999 disestablishments in South Carolina
Soccer clubs in South Carolina
Association football clubs established in 1997
Association football clubs disestablished in 1999